Archirodon Group NV is a Greek company with headquarters in Dordrecht, Netherlands and Athens, Greece, that provides services relating to the construction and maintenance of maritime infrastructure and other construction works on an international basis. The main fields of construction work are marine, dredging and land reclamation contractors; heavy contractors for the oil and gas, power and water industries; electromechanical and infrastructure contractors; geotechnical and foundation engineering services.

Archirodon owns and operates a fleet of 155 vessels which are used for transportation, dredging, towing and docking.

History
Archirodon Construction company was established in 1959 in the form of a J.V. of the Greek firms ARCHIMIDIS, Greece's foremost marine contractor at that time, and ODON & ODOSTROMATON, a road and bridge construction specialist group.

The J.V. started its professional life by building the Port of Benghazi in Libya (1961) and subsequently the Port of Beirut in Lebanon (1962). Its success soon led it to develop into a major contractor in its own merit, establishing itself in 1971 as ARCHIRODON CONSTRUCTION (OVERSEAS) CO.S.A...

Major Projects
Jorf Lasfar
Al Hamriya Port
Port of Jebel Ali -Terminal-2
Port of Tripoli
Khalifa Port
Sheikh Zayed Bridge
Port of Salalah
Palm Islands
King Salman International Complex for Maritime Industries and Service

Offices
Archirodon maintains offices in:
Dubai, Abu Dhabi & Ras Al Khaimah, United Arab Emirates 
Cairo, Egypt 
Jeddah and KSA, Saudi Arabia 
Dordrecht, Netherlands 
Aktau, Kazakhstan
Ashgabat, Turkmenistan
Athens, Greece
Limassol, Cyprus
Arlington, Virginia, United States
Casablanca, Morocco
Muscat, Oman
Geneva, Switzerland

Subsidiaries

Criticism
In 2001, Archirodon was involved in corruption and bid-rigging with construction bids for Egyptian water projects as discussed in the Camp David peace accord.

In 2022, Archirodon drew critism on its involvement in the port of El Aaiún, in the disputed territory of the Western Sahara, from where OCP currently only exports phosphate rock.

References

official website

External links
 Official website of Archirodon Group NV

Multinational companies headquartered in the Netherlands
Construction and civil engineering companies of Greece
Multinational companies headquartered in Greece
Companies based in Athens
Greek brands
1959 establishments in Greece
Companies based in South Holland